Insulin receptor-related protein is a protein that in humans is encoded by the INSRR gene.

References

Further reading

Tyrosine kinase receptors